Ambassadors Theatre was a theatre and cinema in Hay Street, Perth, between 1929 and 1972.

Constructed beginning in 1928 following a visit to the United States by the head of Union Theatres, it was completed and opened in 1929.

In its initial years, the theatre had stage, music and cinema as part of the format of events.

Much of the ornamentation incorporated in the 1929 design was changed during renovations in the late 1930s.

It closed and was demolished in 1972.

Notes

Cinemas in Perth, Western Australia
Former cinemas
Hay Street, Perth
Former buildings and structures in Perth, Western Australia
1929 establishments in Australia
1972 disestablishments in Australia
Buildings and structures completed in 1929
Buildings and structures demolished in 1972
Demolished buildings and structures in Western Australia